The 2013–14 Stanford Cardinal men's basketball team represented Stanford University during the 2013–14 NCAA Division I men's basketball season. The Cardinal, led by sixth year head coach Johnny Dawkins, played their home games at Maples Pavilion and were members of the Pac-12 Conference.

Roster

Schedule
 
|-
!colspan=12 style="background:#8C1515; color:white;"| Exhibition

|-
!colspan=12 style="background:#8C1515; color:white;"| Non-conference regular season

|-
!colspan=12 style="background:#8C1515;"| Pac-12 regular season

|-
!colspan=12 style="background:#8C1515;"| Pac-12 Tournament

|-
!colspan=12 style="background:#8C1515;"| NCAA tournament

See also
2013–14 Stanford Cardinal women's basketball team

Notes
 March 14, 2014 – UCLA's 84–59 win over Stanford was the largest margin in Pac-12 tournament history

References

Stanford
Stanford Cardinal men's basketball seasons
Stanford
Stanford Cardinal men's basketball team
Stanford Cardinal men's basketball team